Les Aventures de M. Colin-Tampon is a novel written by Jules Girardin. The 4th edition, published in 1896, was illustrated by R. Tinant.

First sentence
M. Colin-Tampon avait cinquante ans; il était propriétaire d'une jolie villa sur le territoire de Courbevoie, et, par-dessus le marché, conseiller municipal.

External links
 

1896 French novels